Venere (the Italian name for Venus) may refer to:

Locations
Venère, a French town  
 Porto Venere, an Italian town
Venere dei Marsi, a fraction of Pescina

People
Venere Bianca, an Italian pornographic actress and model
Venere Pizzinato-Papo, an Italian supercentenarian

Other uses
 Venere Imperiale, a 1962 French-Italian film
 "Venere", a Carmen Consoli song from her 1998 album Confusa e felice